Half Japanese is an American art punk band formed by brothers Jad and David Fair around 1975, sometime after the family's relocation to Uniontown, Maryland. Their original instrumentation included a small drum set, which they took turns playing; vocals; and an out-of-tune, distorted guitar. Both Fair brothers sang, although over time Jad moved into the frontman role. As of the last several releases since the 1990s, according to the album and CD credits, the band composes and plays the entirety of the music while Fair, eschewing his role as guitarist from earlier albums, plays almost no guitar but is responsible for the vocals and lyrics, which typically divide into either "love songs or monster songs." The band, still a vital "art punk" unit, has released six albums since 2014 with the same personnel that recorded Hot in 1993. Their last three releases, Why Not?, Invincible and Crazy Hearts have all received four-star reviews from the U.K. magazine, Record Collector, while New Yorker also praised the 2021 release, Crazy Hearts. The band members are John Sluggett (guitar), Gilles-Vincent Rieder (drums), Jason Willett (bass), Mick Hobbs (guitar), and Jad Fair (vocals and guitar).

Band history
Jad is well known for playing an untuned electric guitar. After more than 40 years, he still does not play in any traditional manner; in the documentary Half Japanese: The Band That Would Be King he states that "you do need cords to plug the guitar in but that's pretty much it."

Their lyrics often deal with monsters and the supernatural (especially as influenced by "creature feature" and scifi movies), in addition to more conventional themes, such as young love. They have stated that all their songs are either "love songs or monster songs."

The band released their first single "Calling All Girls" in August 1977, followed by a triple album 1/2 Gentlemen/Not Beasts, that gave them a near-instant cult status. It is possible they were the first band to debut with a triple album.

The band played and recorded as a duo until the early 1980s, when they began incorporating additional members into the group: Mark Jickling (guitar and vocals) and brothers Ricky and John Dreyfuss (drums and saxophone). Since that time, dozens of musicians have come and gone under the Half Japanese banner, including Howard Wuelfing, Don Fleming, Jay Spiegel that are both from the band Velvet Monkeys, and Shockabilly bass player and Shimmy Disc impresario Mark Kramer among others. Jad is the only member who has been with Half Japanese from the beginning. David Fair eventually left the band in the early 1980s to focus on his family. He has continued to make guest appearances with the band from time to time.

The next line-up of Half Japanese came together in the late 1980s, proving to be a long-lasting and stable unit recording several albums and touring frequently throughout the U.S., Europe, and Japan. This incarnation featured guitarist/multi-instrumentalist John Sluggett (also a longtime member of Moe Tucker's band), multi-instrumentalist Jason Willett, Mick Hobbs, and drummer Gilles Reider. Since then, the group has worked with Moe Tucker from The Velvet Underground, who produced and performed on Fire In the Sky (1992), as well as The Band That Would Be King, and with Fred Frith, and John Zorn, among others.

Fans and supporters of Half Japanese include Penn Jillette, who helped the band release some of their albums on his label, 50 Skidillion Watts, and Kurt Cobain, who had them open some dates of Nirvana's 1993 In Utero tour. Cobain was wearing a Half Japanese T-shirt when he died.

The band's history and influence are chronicled in the 1993 documentary Half Japanese: The Band That Would Be King by Jeff Feuerzeig. The band was chosen by Jeff Mangum of Neutral Milk Hotel to perform at the All Tomorrow's Parties festival that he curated in March 2012 in Minehead.

The 1995 album Hot was one of their noisiest grunge albums with heavily distorted vocals and guitars. In 1997, the band released Heaven Sent. The title track, over 60 minutes long, was a live recording for a radio broadcast on Radio 5 VPRO's De Avonden.

In 2011, the band toured through Europe in the formation Jad Fair, John Sluggett, Jason Willett, Mick Hobbs, and Gilles-Vincent Reider. Once a year David Fair is in charge of the ShakeMore Music Festival in Westminster, Maryland. Each year the start up formation with the Fair brothers, the Dreyfuss brothers, John Moremen, and Mark Jickling perform at ShakeMore. Early drummer Rick Dreyfuss died on March 14, 2013, and was replaced by Skizz Cyzyk and Chris "Batworth" Ciattei from the band Go Pills.

In October 2013, long time band members, John Sluggett, Gilles-Vincent Rieder, Mick Hobbs, Jason Willett, and Jad Fair, toured with Neutral Milk Hotel. In 2014 a new album, Overjoyed, was released on Joyful Noise Recordings.

Discography

Studio albums
 Half Gentlemen/Not Beasts (Armageddon, 1980)
 Loud (Armageddon, 1981)
 Our Solar System (Iridescence, 1984)
 Sing No Evil (Iridescence, 1985)
 Music To Strip By (50 Skidillion Watts, 1987)
 Charmed Life (50 Skidillion Watts, 1988)
 The Band That Would Be King (50 Skidillion Watts, 1989)
 We Are They Who Ache with Amorous Love (TEC Tones, 1990)
 Fire In The Sky (Paperhouse, 1992)
 Hot (Safe House, 1995)
 Bone Head (Alternative Tentacles, 1997)
 Heaven Sent (Emperor Jones, 1997)
 Hello (Alternative Tentacles, 2001)
 Overjoyed (Joyful Noise, 2014)
 Perfect (Joyful Noise, 2016)
Hear the Lions Roar (Fire Records, 2017)
Why Not? (Fire Records, 2018)
Invincible (Fire Records, 2019)
Crazy Hearts (Fire Records, 2020)

Live albums
 Half Alive (Cassette - live at DC Space and the Red Door, Baltimore - 50 Skidillion Watts, 1977)
 50 Skidillion Watts Live (Calypso Now, 1984)
 Boo: Live in Europe 1992 (TEC Tones, 1994)

Compilation albums
 Best Of Half Japanese (Timebomb Japan, 1993)
 Greatest Hits 2 CDs / 3 LPs (Safe House, 1995)
 Best Of Half Japanese Vol. 2 (Timebomb Japan, 1995)

EPs
 "Calling All Girls" (50 Skidillion Watts, 1977)
 Horrible (Press, 1982)
 Real Cool Time/What Can I Do/Monopoly EP (Overzealous Editions, 1989)
 Everybody Knows, Twang 1 EP (Seminal Twang, 1991)
 4 Four Kids EP (Ralph, 1991)
 Postcard EP (Earl, 1991)
 Eye of the Hurricane/Said and Done/U.S. Teens are Spoiled Bums/Daytona Beach EP (1991)

Singles
 "No Direct Line from my Brain to My Heart"/"(I Don't Want to Have) Mono (No More)" 7" (50 Skidillion Watts, 1978)
 "Spy" (Armageddon, 1981)
 "How Will I Know" (Press, 1982)
 "U.S. Teens Are Spoiled Bums" (50 Skidillion Watts, 1988)
 "T For Texas"/"Go Go Go Go" (X.X.O.O. Fan Club, 1990)

Film/video
Half Japanese: The Band That Would Be King  (Jeff Feuerzeig, Washington Square Films, 1993)

Books
 All the Doctors in Hot Springs, December 2012

References

External links
 The Half Japanese Fan Site
 Half Japanese entry at the Trouser Press website
 Half Japanese band page at Alternative Tentacles label website
 Jad Fair's official website
 Interview to Jad Fair
 Half Japanese: The Band That Would Be King
 The Shakemore Festival image collection at the Internet Archive featuring Half Japanese & friends

Listening
 Epitonic.com: Half Japanese featuring tracks from "Hello"
 Myspace page featuring tracks from various albums

Alternative Tentacles artists
American noise rock music groups
American art rock groups
Drag City (record label) artists
Family musical groups
Punk rock groups from Maryland
Punk rock groups from Michigan
Musical groups established in 1975
Joyful Noise Recordings artists
Fire Records (UK) artists